Pavapuri may refer to:
 Pawapuri, a Jain pilgrimage in Nalanda, Bihar
 Shree Pavapuri Tirth Dham, a Jain pilgrimage in Rajasthan